Stack was a US unit of volume for stacked firewood. Symbol for the unit was stk.

Definition 
108 cubic foot.

Conversion 
1 stack ≡ 64 Load (squared)

1 stack≡ 64 cubic foot

1 stack≡ 64 m3

References

Units of volume
Customary units of measurement